Hans Freddie Brorsson (born 4 June 1997) is a Swedish footballer who plays for Österlen FF.

Career

Club career
Brorsson started playing football in Trelleborgs FF when he was four years old. At the age of ten, the family moved to Höllviken and Brorsson started instead in BK Näset. After a two years in the club, Brorsson went to Malmö FF.

In July 2015, Brorsson joined Trelleborgs FF. In November 2016, he extended his contract by two years.

In December 2018, Brorsson was bought by Örgryte IS, where he signed a two-year contract. In March 2020, Brorsson and Örgryte IS agreed to terminate the contract. Later in the same month, he joined Division 2 club Österlen FF.

References

External links
Freddie Brorsson at SvFF

Swedish footballers
1997 births
Living people
Sweden youth international footballers
Association football forwards
Allsvenskan players
Superettan players
Ettan Fotboll players
Division 2 (Swedish football) players
Trelleborgs FF players
Örgryte IS players